SS Chicora was a passenger-and-freight steamer built in 1892 for service on the Great Lakes. Considered to be one of Lake Michigans finest steamers, she was lost with all hands in January 1895. She is now remembered chiefly for being mentioned by Chicago writer Nelson Algren, in Algren’s prose-poem, Chicago: City on the Make: “Who now knows the sorrowful long-ago name of the proud steamer Chicora, down with all hands in the ice off South Haven?” as well as “Sunk under the ice in the waves off South Haven, sunk with all hands for good and forever, for keeps and a single day.”

Construction and design 

Chicora, a wooden-hulled, screw-propelled, passenger-cargo ship, was built in 1892 by the Detroit Drydock Company of Detroit, Michigan, for the Graham & Morton Transportation Company. Designed by Frank Kirby, her cost was $150,000. Chicora was launched from the builders Orleans Street yard at about 3 pm, 26 June 1892, and completed in July; her yard number was 111.

She had a tonnage of 1,123 gross tons, or 900 tons burden. Chicora was licensed to carry 1,500 passengers as a summer excursion boat, with passenger accommodations which included 56 staterooms, sleeping quarters for 200, a large smoking room and "spacious" social hall. Her passenger cabins, grand staircase and gangways were all finished in mahogany, and an electric plant provided power for the ships 250 lights. For freight service in the winter off-season, Chicora was built "especially stout" and had  outer planking and three waterproof compartments.

The ship had a speed of approximately —a fast speed for the time.

When newly built, Chicora was described as a "masterpiece", with "lines ... as symmetrical and beautiful as any yacht". She was considered to be the premier ship of the Graham and Morton Line, and one of the finest vessels on Lake Michigan—the "Queen Mary" of the lake.

Service history 

In the winter of 1893/94,  Chicora was placed on the St. Joseph–Milwaukee route, and again the following winter.

Chicora sank in Lake Michigan on 21 January 1895 off Milwaukee with a cargo of flour. Pieces of wreckage are also reported to have been found. Wreckage was brought into port by a Tug in 1917. In April 1895 it was reported wreckage was coming ashore at New Buffalo, Michigan. On 19 April 1895 a witness claimed to have seen the Chicora stern down and bow up in the lake between South Haven and Saugatuck, Michigan, on 23 January 1895. Two messages that appeared to be from the ship were also found. A bottle containing a note reading "All is lost, could see land if not snowed and blowed. Engine give out, drifting to shore in ice. Captain and clerk are swept off. We have a hard time of it. 10:15 o'clock." was found on April 14. A week later a jar was found in Illinois containing a note reading "Chicora engines broke. Drifted into trough of sea. We have lost all hope. She has gone to pieces. Good bye. McClure, Engineer."

References 

Steamships of the United States
1892 ships
Ships built in Detroit
Maritime incidents in 1895
Missing ships
Ships lost with all hands
Shipwrecks of Lake Michigan
Great Lakes freighters